The brown accentor (Prunella fulvescens) is a species of bird in the family Prunellidae. It is found in Afghanistan, China, India, Kazakhstan, Mongolia, Nepal, Pakistan, Russia, Tajikistan, Turkmenistan, and Uzbekistan.

Its natural habitat is Mediterranean-type shrubby vegetation.

References

brown accentor
Birds of Central Asia
Birds of Afghanistan
Birds of Bhutan
Birds of China
Birds of Nepal
Birds of Mongolia
brown accentor
Taxonomy articles created by Polbot